Arena Pernambuco (Portuguese: Arena de Pernambuco), officially named Estádio Governador Carlos Wilson Campos, is a multi-use stadium with a capacity of 46,154 spectators located in the western suburbs of the Recife metropolitan area, in São Lourenço da Mata, Brazil. It is mostly used for football matches and was notably used to host some matches during the 2014 FIFA World Cup. 

In 2012 Clube Náutico Capibaribe, one of three professional football clubs in the Recife metro area, signed an agreement to become part owners of the new stadium. In July 2013, Clube Náutico Capibaribe started to play all of their home games at Itaipava Arena Pernambuco. The stadium was previously known as Itaipava Arena Pernambuco under a sponsorship arrangement with brewing company Grupo Petrópolis between 2013 and 2016.

History
Construction of the new stadium was carried out by Odebrecht Infraestrutura and is being completed in various stages.  When fully finished the area around Arena Pernambuco will include a university campus, indoor arena, hotel and convention center, plus commercial, business and residential units and a large entertainment complex with shopping centers, cinemas, bars and restaurants.

A "Green" arena:  Odebrecht Energia, in partnership with Neoenergia, is implementing a solar power plant in Pernambuco Arena. With an investment of about $13 million, the solar plant will generate 1 MW of installed capacity and is part of a program of research and development of solar power in the country. When not filling the stadium, the energy generated by the plant will be able to meet the average consumption of 6,000 people.



2013 FIFA Confederations Cup

2014 FIFA World Cup

Brazil national football team

Concerts

In popular culture
EA Sports added all 12 venues used at the 2014 FIFA World Cup, including the Arena Pernambuco, to the 2014 FIFA World Cup Brazil video game.
The Arena Pernambuco is featured on "You Don't Have to Live Like a Referee", the sixteenth episode of the 25th season of the American animated sitcom The Simpsons, and the 546th episode of the series. Homer Simpson acts as a FIFA World Cup 2014 referee on a game played at Arena Pernambuco.

References

External links

www.odebrechtnacopa.com.br
www.cidadedacopa.com.br
Stadium Guide Profile

Football venues in Pernambuco
2014 FIFA World Cup stadiums
Sports venues in Recife
Sports venues completed in 2013
2013 FIFA Confederations Cup stadiums